The Primetime Emmy Award for Outstanding Writing for a Comedy Series is an annual award presented as part of the Primetime Emmy Awards. It recognizes writing excellence in regular comedic series, most of which can generally be described as situation comedies. It was first presented in 1955 as Outstanding Written Comedy Material.

Winners and nominations

1950s

1960s

1970s

1980s

1990s

2000s

2010s

2020s

Total awards by network

 CBS – 22
 NBC – 19
 ABC – 8
 Fox – 5
 FX – 2
 HBO – 2
 Netflix – 2
 Prime Video – 2
 HBO Max — 1
 Pop TV – 1

Individuals with multiple awards

3 awards
 Allan Burns
 Nat Hiken 
 Coleman Jacoby 
 Carl Reiner 
 Arnold Rosen 
 Tony Webster 
 Ed. Weinberger

2 awards
 David Angell
 Aziz Ansari 
 George Balzer 
 James L. Brooks
 Louis C.K.
 Stan Daniels
 Sam Denoff
 Tina Fey
 Anne Flett-Giordano 
 Billy Friedberg 
 Hal Goldman
 Al Gordon 
 Mitchell Hurwitz 
 Michael Leeson
 Steven Levitan 
 Christopher Lloyd
 David Lloyd 
 Sam Perrin 
 Bill Persky
 Chuck Ranberg 
 Terry Ryan
 Leonard Stern

Individuals with multiple nominations

9 nominations
 David Lloyd

8 nominations
 Alec Berg

7 nominations
 George Balzer
 Larry David
 Larry Gelbart
 Hal Goldman
 Al Gordon
 Sam Perrin
 Garry Shandling

6 nominations
 Glen Charles
 Les Charles
 Nat Hiken
 Arnie Rosen
 Peter Tolan

5 nominations
 Allan Burns
 Louis C.K.
 David Crane
 David Isaacs
 Coleman Jacoby
 Joe Keenan
 Ken Levine
 Mel Tolkin
 Tony Webster

4 nominations
 Alan Alda
 Gary Belkin
 James L. Brooks
 Mel Brooks
 Jack Burditt
 Robert Carlock
 Greg Daniels
 Diane English
 Tina Fey
 Sheldon Keller
 Michael Patrick King
 Jeffrey Klarik
 Michael Leeson
 Steven Levitan
 Christopher Lloyd
 David Panich
 Carl Reiner
 Bob Schiller
 Michael Schur
 Jay Tarses
 Ed. Weinberger
 Bob Weiskopf

3 nominations
 Danny Arnold
 Jim Carlson
 Bob Carroll, Jr.
 Peter Casey
 Stan Daniels
 Sam Denoff
 Jack Douglas
 Bill Hader
 Buck Henry
 Matt Hubbard
 Mitchell Hurwitz
 Coslough Johnson
 Milt Josefsberg
 Norman Lear
 David Lee
 Marc London
 David Mandel
 Allan Manings
 Thomas Meehan
 Dave O'Brien
 Bill Persky
 Madelyn Pugh
 Martin Ragaway
 John Rappaport
 Stefani Robinson
 Roswell Rogers
 Philip Rosenthal
 Terry Ryan
 Herbert Sargent
 Paul Simms
 Red Skelton
 Leonard B. Stern

2 nominations
 David Angell
 Lucia Aniello
 Aziz Ansari
 Simon Blackwell
 Linda Bloodworth-Thomason
 James Bobin
 John Carsey
 Tucker Cawley
 Ernest Chambers
 Larry Charles
 Cindy Chupack
 Jemaine Clement
 Richard Day
 Gary Dontzig
 Paul W. Downs
 Robert Emmett
 Maya Erskine
 Ken Estin
 Gene Farmer
 Paul Feig
 Anne Flett-Giordano
 Donald Glover
 Maya Forbes
 Gerald Gardner
 Ricky Gervais
 Everett Greenbaum
 Jeff Greenstein
 Alex Gregory
 Chris Hayward
 Paul Henning
 Don Hinkley
 Brendan Hunt
 Peter Huyck
 Armando Iannucci
 Hal Kanter
 David E. Kelley
 Joe Kelly
 Paul Keyes
 Ernie Kovacs
 Jeremy Lloyd

 John Markus
 Mike Marmer
 Bret McKenzie
 Stephen Merchant
 Lorne Michaels
 Jim Mulligan
 Lorenzo Music
 Jess Oppenheimer
 Tom Patchett
 Steven Peterman
 Arthur Phillips
 Amy Poehler
 Earl Pomerantz
 Larry Rhine
 Tony Roche
 Ray Romano
 Julie Rottenberg 
 Mike Royce
 Al Schwartz
 Sherwood Schwartz
 Phil Sharp
 Tony Sheehan
 Amy Sherman-Palladino
 Rosie Shuster
 Larry Siegel
 Ed Simmons
 Neil Simon
 Stephen Spears
 Jen Statsky
 Michael Stewart
 Jason Sudeikis
 Burt Styler
 Saul Turteltaub
 Jim Vallely
 Jon Vitti
 Hugh Wedlock Jr.
 Michael J. Weithorn
 Hugh Wilson
 Harry Winkler
 Elisa Zuritsky
 Alan Zweibel

Programs with multiple awards

5 awards
 The Mary Tyler Moore Show (4 consecutive)

4 awards
 The Dick Van Dyke Show (3 consecutive)
 Frasier (3 consecutive)

3 awards
 All in the Family (2 consecutive)
 The Phil Silvers Show (2 consecutive)
 30 Rock (2 consecutive)

2 awards
 Arrested Development (consecutive)
 Cheers (consecutive)
 The Jack Benny Program (consecutive)
 Louie
 Malcolm in the Middle (consecutive)
 Master of None (consecutive)
 Modern Family (consecutive)
 Murphy Brown
 Seinfeld (consecutive)
 Taxi (consecutive)

Programs with multiple nominations

13 nominations
 Cheers
 The Larry Sanders Show
 30 Rock

11 nominations
 Seinfeld

10 nominations
 M*A*S*H

9 nominations
 All in the Family
 Frasier
 The Mary Tyler Moore Show

7 nominations
 Murphy Brown
 The Office
 Sex and the City
 Taxi
 Veep

6 nominations
 The Dick Van Dyke Show
 Everybody Loves Raymond
 The Jack Benny Program
 Silicon Valley
 The Wonder Years

5 nominations
 Arrested Development
 Barry
 Louie
 What We Do in the Shadows

4 nominations
 Atlanta
 Barney Miller
 The Cosby Show
 Episodes

3 nominations
 Buffalo Bill
 Father Knows Best
 The Golden Girls
 The Phil Silvers Show
 The Red Skelton Show
 Ted Lasso

2 nominations
 Ally McBeal
 The Associates
 The Bernie Mac Show
 Caesar's Hour
 Car 54, Where Are You?
 The Days and Nights of Molly Dodd
 Ellen
 Extras
 Family Ties
 Flight of the Conchords
 Freaks and Geeks
 Friends
 The George Gobel Show
 Get Smart
 The Good Place
 Hacks
 He & She
 I Love Lucy
 It's Garry Shandling's Show
 Malcolm in the Middle
 Master of None
 Modern Family
 Newhart
 Parks and Recreation
 PEN15
 Schitt's Creek
 Russian Doll
 That Was the Week That Was

See also
 Primetime Emmy Award for Outstanding Writing for a Drama Series
 Primetime Emmy Award for Outstanding Writing for a Variety Series

Notes

References

Writing, comedy
Screenwriting awards for television